In mathematical group theory, a Demushkin group (also written as Demuškin or Demuskin) is a pro-p group G having a certain properties relating to duality in group cohomology. More precisely, G must be such that the first cohomology group with coefficients in Fp = Z/p Z has finite rank, the second cohomology  group has rank 1, and the cup product induces a non-degenerate pairing

H1(G,Fp)× H1(G,Fp) → H2(G,Fp).

Demushkin groups occur as the Galois groups of the maximal p-extensions of local number fields containing all p-th roots of unity.

References

Group theory